Henry Gramajo (born 19 September 1970) is a Uruguayan equestrian. He competed in the individual eventing at the 2000 Summer Olympics.

References

External links
 

1970 births
Living people
Uruguayan male equestrians
Olympic equestrians of Uruguay
Equestrians at the 2000 Summer Olympics
Place of birth missing (living people)
20th-century Uruguayan people
21st-century Uruguayan people